James Naremore, born James Otis Naremore, is a film, English and Comparative Literature scholar based at Indiana University.  Now retired, he retains the titles of Chancellors' Professor of Communication and Culture, English, and Comparative Literature at Indiana University Bloomington.

Bibliography

References

External links
 James Naremore on Criterion

Film theorists
Living people
Year of birth missing (living people)